Artukekang is a place situated in the heart of Dongkamukam town, in West Karbi Anglong district of Assam, India. The place is well known for its football team.

Etymology
Artukekang comes from the Karbi words, which is a portmanteau of two Karbi word Artu and Kekang, meaning Forest covered and "of sacred place" respectively.

Location
 Latitude: 25.93826778
 Longitude: 92.93826778
 Sea level: 76 m

Institutions and schools
 Artukekang English High School

Ponds and lakes
 Ronghem Alank tenk
 Pahok hem alank tenk

Playground
 Artukekang Playground

Cafe
 Engti's Cafe

Parks and gardens
 Ove-Nokjir abiri, N.D garden

References

Villages in West Karbi Anglong district